Tzuriel is a moshav in northern Israel. Located in the Galilee, it falls under the jurisdiction of Ma'ale Yosef Regional Council.

History
The moshav was established in 1949 on land which had belonged to the depopulated Palestinian village of Suhmata.

The founders were Yemenite Jews from the town of Beit 'Adaqah, led by spiritual leader Rabbi Shalom Nehorai HaLevi. It was named for the biblical figure Zuriel, son of Abihail (Num 3:35).

After a number of years the founders left and a group of Moroccan immigrants moved in.

References

Moshavim
Populated places established in 1950
Populated places in Northern District (Israel)
1950 establishments in Israel
Yemeni-Jewish culture in Israel
Moroccan-Jewish culture in Israel